Abdul Aziz Deen-Conteh (born 14 January 1993) is a Sierra Leonean former professional footballer who played as a left-back.

He represented England at youth level whilst on the books at Chelsea. He spent the 2013–14 season with Greek club Ergotelis, making seven appearances in the Greek Superleague. He joined Port Vale in November 2014, and was loaned out to Boston United in August 2015, but left Vale in January 2016 without making a first team appearance. He moved on to Moldovan side Zaria Bălți – winning the Moldovan Cup in 2016 – and Georgian side Zugdidi, before he returned to England in August 2017 to sign with Dover Athletic.

Club career

Chelsea
Deen-Conteh was born in Sierra Leone but grew up in Deptford, England, joining Chelsea at the age of 13. He played both legs of the club's FA Youth Cup final victory over Aston Villa in 2010. He was given a two-year professional contract by manager Carlo Ancelotti. He was a member of their Champions League squad for the 2012–13 season, though he did not make an appearance for them. After being released by the club in June 2013, he went on trial with Millwall the following month. He came close to joining Notts County, but negotiations broke down at the last minute.

Ergotelis
He signed for Greek club Ergotelis on a two-year contract in August 2013. He found the left-back spot occupied by the club captain and made only seven first team appearances at the Pankritio Stadium in the second half of the 2013–14 season. He left the club after the Greek financial crisis left the club unable to pay player's wages.

Port Vale
He began training with English League One side Port Vale in November 2014, and signed for the club on a deal running until summer 2017 after impressing during his trial spell.

He joined National League North club Boston United on a one-month loan on 11 August 2015. Again he found himself behind a club captain in the pecking order, with Carl Dickinson rarely missing a game at left-back. He was released by Port Vale in January 2016, having not made a first team appearance at Vale Park. He went on to say "I didn't really get along with the gaffer", and said Rob Page "wasn't thinking about the players, he wasn't thinking about the club, he was thinking about himself".

Later career
Deen-Conteh joined Moldovan National Division club Zaria Bălți soon after leaving Port Vale. He played eight games for the club, including a substitute appearance in the 2016 final of the Moldovan Cup at Zimbru Stadium as Zaria beat Milsami Orhei 1–0 after extra-time. After the leaving the club he considered signing with league rivals FC Milsami, but instead moved to Georgian side Zugdidi later in 2016. He left Zugdidi in October 2016 after the club struggled to pay his wages.

On 24 August 2017, Deen-Conteh returned to England to sign with National League side Dover Athletic. He made his debut for the "Whites" when he came off the bench in a 1–0 defeat at Macclesfield Town on 25 August. He went on to make a further three substitute appearances before he was released from the Crabble Athletic Ground upon the expiry of his contract at the end of the 2017–18 season. He spent time on the bench at Dulwich Hamlet in September 2018, without being signed to a contract.

International career
Deen-Conteh represented England at youth international level, appearing for the under-16 and under-19 teams. In March 2013 he committed his international football to Sierra Leone, the country of his birth, after being called up by their senior national team; however, he was unable to play due to an expired passport. He was called up again in May 2013, alongside fellow Chelsea player Samuel Bangura. He was not given clearance to play for the senior team however and expressed doubts over whether he would accept any further call-ups as he criticised the Sierra Leone Football Association for their organisational skills. However, Deen-Conteh ended up getting called up and capped officially by Sierra Leone, and made his debut against Malawi.

Career statistics

Club

International

Honours
Chelsea
FA Youth Cup: 2010

Zaria Bălți
Moldovan Cup: 2016

References

1993 births
Living people
People from Bo District
Sierra Leonean footballers
Sierra Leone international footballers
English footballers
England youth international footballers
English sportspeople of Sierra Leonean descent
Chelsea F.C. players
Ergotelis F.C. players
Port Vale F.C. players
Boston United F.C. players
CSF Bălți players
FC Zugdidi players
Dover Athletic F.C. players
Dulwich Hamlet F.C. players
Super League Greece players
National League (English football) players
Moldovan Super Liga players
Erovnuli Liga players
Association football fullbacks
Sierra Leonean expatriate footballers
Sierra Leonean expatriate sportspeople in the United Kingdom
Expatriate footballers in England
Sierra Leonean expatriate sportspeople in Greece
Expatriate footballers in Greece
Sierra Leonean expatriate sportspeople in Moldova
Expatriate footballers in Moldova
Sierra Leonean expatriate sportspeople in Georgia (country)
Expatriate footballers in Georgia (country)